M1905 can refer to:
 M1905 bayonet
 FN M1905 pistol
 Colt M1905 New Marine revolver
 Colt M1905 pistol
 Smith & Wesson Model 1905 revolver
 M1905 variant of the Ross rifle
 Puteaux M1905 machine gun variant of the St. Étienne Mle 1907
 120 mm Krupp howitzer M1905
 6-inch gun M1905

See also
 M5 (disambiguation)